The Ciervists, also known as the Ciervist Conservatives (CC), were a political faction within the Liberal Conservative Party, led by Juan de la Cierva y Peñafiel, which split from the party in 1914.

The party lost relevance after Miguel Primo de Rivera's coup in 1923, though Juan de la Cierva still held high-profile positions in the last monarchist government of Juan Bautista Aznar-Cabañas in 1931.

References

Conservative Party (Spain)
Catholic political parties
Defunct political parties in Spain
Political parties established in 1914
Political parties disestablished in 1931
1914 establishments in Spain
1931 disestablishments in Spain
Restoration (Spain)